João Domingues (born 5 October 1993) is a Portuguese tennis player who currently competes on the ATP Challenger as well as the ATP World Tour. In 2015, Domingues made his debut for Portugal Davis Cup team. In February 2020, he achieved a career-high singles world ranking No. 150.

Challenger and Futures finals

Singles: 22 (10–12)

Doubles: 28 (15–13)

Performance timelines

Singles
Current through the 2022 Australian Open.

Career earnings

* As of 20 May 2019

National participation

Davis Cup (2 wins, 0 losses)
Domingues debuted for the Portugal Davis Cup team in 2015 and has played 2 matches in 2 ties. His singles record is 2–0 and his doubles record is 0–0 (2–0 overall).

   indicates the result of the Davis Cup match followed by the score, date, place of event, the zonal classification and its phase, and the court surface.

See also

Portugal Davis Cup team

References

External links

1993 births
Living people
Portuguese male tennis players
People from Oliveira de Azeméis
Sportspeople from Porto